Maria Christova was a Bulgarian lyric soprano and also, a noted concert soloist born on 15 October 1937. She won the Toulouse International Singing Competition in 1961. She subsequently was a guest artist in Bulgaria, Austria, Switzerland, Germany and France. In the 1970s, she was a member of the company at the Royal Flemish Opera in Antwerp, Belgium, where she performed in an ample variety of roles such as Pamina in The Magic Flute, the Countess in The Marrriage of Figaro, Violetta in La Traviata, Nabucco (role unconfirmed), Tatyana in Eugene Onegin, Dargomijski in Rusalka, Mimi and Musetta in La Bohème, Liu in Turandot, Floria Tosca, as well as several roles in Hungarian and Viennese operetta, such as Victoria in Victoria and her Hussar, Lisa in The Land of Smiles, Maria-Anna Elisa in Paganini, the title role of Countess Maritza, and Rosalinde in Die Fledermaus, also known as The Bat or The Flittermouse. Maria Christova was also a noted artist at the Royal Opera at Ghent (Belgium) during the 1968–1969 season, and from 1976 to 1980. At Ghent, she premiered Donizetti's opera Lucrezia Borgia in 1969. Throughout her career and in later life, she fostered young talents, and organised concerts and recitals in Antwerp, where she was residing until her death. She has notably recorded for Nonesuch Records and Terpsichore, and she leaves a radio recording legacy. Maria Christova died at Antwerp on 17 May 2022.

Recordings (selection) 
 A Heritage of Folk Song from Old Russia (Nonesuch H-72010, 1966)
 Slavish Recital (Terpsichore 1982 018)
 Peter Tchaikovsky: Songs (Terpsichore – 1982 039)

References

External links 
 Nonesuch Explorer Series LPs
 Vinyl Divas

Bulgarian sopranos
Russian sopranos
Living people
Year of birth missing (living people)
Place of birth missing (living people)
20th-century Bulgarian women opera singers